Sira Abed Rego (born 20 November 1973) is a Spanish politician affiliated with United Left (IU), who was elected as a Member of the European Parliament in 2019. In that capacity she was nominated as European United Left–Nordic Green Left's candidate for President of the European Parliament, placing fourth in the election held on 3 July 2019.

On 15 September 2022, she was one of 16 MEPs who voted against condemning President Daniel Ortega of Nicaragua for human rights violations, in particular the arrest of Bishop Rolando Álvarez.  She has also been committed to the fight against violence against women in all areas and throughout the world.

References

1973 births
Living people
MEPs for Spain 2019–2024
21st-century women MEPs for Spain
United Left (Spain) MEPs
United Left (Spain) politicians